Tomato was the fourth and final studio album of the South Korean girl group Chakra before disbanding. The singles were From me to you, True love in this world is a Lie and Why I'm the only One. The album sold about 100,000 copies.

Track listing 

 Intro
 Nan Neoege (난 너에게)
 Wae Naman (왜 나만)
 I Sesange Jinsilhan Sarangeun Geojitmarida (이 세상에 진실한 사랑은 거짓말이다)
 Tajan (타잔)
 Ex-boyfriend
 Hey boy
 The Anonymity
 Best love
 The sign
 Na (나)
 fever
 The friendship
 outro
 Hidden Track: Nan Neoege (Remix Version) (난 너에게)

2003 albums
Chakra (group) albums